Patricia Belcher (born 1954) is an American film, stage and television actress, known for her roles as Ms. Dabney in the Disney Channel sitcom Good Luck Charlie, and as United States Attorney Caroline Julian in the FOX crime procedural comedy-drama series Bones. In film, she is known for starring in Jeepers Creepers (2001), 500 Days of Summer (2009), Bad Words (2013), Kajillionaire (2020), and Gatlopp (2022).

Life and career
Belcher was born in Helena, Montana. She is partly of African-American descent. Prior to becoming an actress, Belcher was a contestant on Jeopardy! losing to then attorney Ron Black in one of his 5 games. She studied acting under the guidance of many drama teachers, including the Oscar-nominated actress, Beah Richards.

Belcher is known for playing judges, doctors, nurses, government officials, and other authority figures, often to comic effect. She has made many appearances in films and television series including The Number 23, Unknown, Jeepers Creepers, Heartbreakers and (500) Days of Summer. She also has made appearances in television series, including The Norm Show (on which she had a recurring role), Everybody Loves Raymond, Boston Legal, The Jake Effect, Twins, The Proud Family, Seinfeld, Sister, Sister, In Plain Sight, The Middle, It's Always Sunny in Philadelphia, Still Sitting down, Beverly Hills, 90210, Bones, and How to Get Away with Murder. She is also one of the most active actors appearing in commercials. Products include GEICO, Staples, Time Warner, American Cancer Society and Wells Fargo.

In 2001, Belcher was cast as Jezelle Gay Hartman, a psychic, in the horror film Jeepers Creepers. The film received mixed reviews from critics, however received positive awards from audiences. 
The film was a commercial success,  opening in 2,944 theaters and took in a domestic gross of $37,904,175; it later made $21,313,614 internationally, making a total of $59,217,789 worldwide.

From 2006 until 2017, she recurred on Bones as attorney Caroline Julian. 
Belcher produced her 2008 role in the film Lower Learning as Colette.

In 2009, she played Millie in the romantic comedy (500) Days of Summer. The film received positive reviews from critics upon its release. Based on over 214 professional reviews, it obtained a "Certified Fresh" seal on Rotten Tomatoes with an approval rating of 86% and an average score of 7.6 out of 10. The film was a box office success as well, becoming a  "sleeper hit" and earning over $60 million in worldwide returns, far exceeding its $7.5 million budget. Also that year through 2010, Belcher had a recurring role on Better Off Ted as Janet S. Crotum, the head of human resources of Veridian Dynamics. 
On May 13, 2010, ABC officially canceled the series due to low viewing figures. After the cancellation of Better Off Ted Belcher moved on and began another recurring role on the Disney Channel sitcom Good Luck Charlie, playing the strict and easily annoyed neighbor, Estelle Dabney. It ran for four seasons ending in 2014.

In 2013, she appeared as Ingrid in Bad Words, and she voiced Chimamanda Lobo in the video game Dead Island: Riptide. Later that year Belcher again teamed with Jeepers Creepers writer and director Victor Salva for his horror film Dark House. As well as appearing on The Millers, and Partners.

In 2015, she appeared in the GEICO commercial with the band Europe. She was Grandmother in Wells Fargo's 2017 commercial "Lost Debit Card". She also appeared in 2 other GEICO commercials, once as a DMV picture taker and a waitress in a 24 hour diner.

In 2022, she made a brief appearance in the film Father Stu playing the role of a meat and seafood grocery store clerk. She also began recurring on another Disney Channel sitcom, The Villains of Valley View.

Filmography

Film

Television

Video games

Television

References

External links
 
 TVGuide PROfilE
 https://web.archive.org/web/20150426140707/http://www.jeopardy.com/minisites/tocyearbook/#1985

Living people
Actresses from Montana
American film actresses
American stage actresses
American television actresses
African-American actresses
People from Helena, Montana
20th-century American actresses
21st-century American actresses
Jeopardy! contestants
20th-century African-American women
20th-century African-American people
21st-century African-American women
1954 births